Popliteal pterygium syndrome (PPS) is an inherited condition affecting the face, limbs, and genitalia. The syndrome goes by a number of names including the popliteal web syndrome and, more inclusively, the facio-genito-popliteal syndrome. The term PPS was coined by Gorlin et al. in 1968 on the basis of the most unusual anomaly, the popliteal pterygium (a web behind the knee).

Symptoms and signs 
Clinical expressions of PPS are highly variable, but include the following:
 Limb findings: an extensive web running from behind the knee down to the heel (90%), malformed toenails, and webbed toes.
 Facial findings: cleft palate with or without cleft lip (75%), pits in the lower lip (40%), fibrous bands in the mouth known as syngnathia (25%), and tissue connecting the upper and lower eyelids
 Genital findings (50%): hypoplasia of the labia majora, malformation of the scrotum, and cryptorchidism.

Genetics 

The genetic locus for PPS was localized to chromosome 1 in 1999.
The disorder is inherited in an autosomal dominant manner and is due to mutation of the IRF6 gene. Most reported cases are sporadic; advanced parental age is found in a number of these cases, suggesting new mutations.

The term PPS has also been used for two rare autosomal recessively inherited conditions: Lethal PPS and PPS with Ectodermal Dysplasia. Although both conditions feature a cleft lip/palate, syngnathia, and popliteal pterygium, they are clinically distinguishable from the autosomal dominant case. Lethal PPS is differentiated by microcephaly, corneal aplasia, ectropion, bony fusions, hypoplastic nose and absent thumbs, while PPS with Ectodermal Dysplasia is differentiated by woolly hair, brittle nails, ectodermal anomalies, and fissure of the sacral vertebrae.

Relationship to Van der Woude syndrome 

Van der Woude syndrome (VDWS) and popliteal pterygium syndrome (PPS) are allelic variants of the same condition; that is, they are caused by different mutations of the same gene. PPS includes all the features of VDWS, plus popliteal pterygium, syngnathia, distinct toe/nail abnormality, syndactyly, and genito-urinary malformations.

Diagnosis

Treatment

Epidemiology 

The diagnosis of PPS has been made in several ethnic groups, including Caucasian, Japanese, and sub-Saharan African. Males and females are equally likely to have the syndrome. Since the disorder is rare, its incidence rate is difficult to estimate, but is less than 1 in 300,000.

See also 
 List of cutaneous conditions
 Multiple pterygium syndrome

References

External links 

Autosomal dominant disorders
Genodermatoses
Rare syndromes
Transcription factor deficiencies